Space are a band from Liverpool, England, who formed in 1992 initially as a trio of Tommy Scott (vocals, bass, guitar), Jamie Murphy (vocals, guitar) and Jamie Island (drums), who was later replaced by Andy Parle. Keyboard player Franny Griffiths joined the line-up a year later, and the band signed to Gut Records in 1995, eventually rising to prominence with hit singles such as "Female of the Species", "Me and You Versus the World", "Neighbourhood", "Avenging Angels" and "The Ballad of Tom Jones", the latter a duet with Cerys Matthews of Catatonia.

Space pursued an eclectic sound dubbed "queasy listening" by critics, embracing electronica and sampling in their work and drawing from genres as diverse as hip hop, techno, post-punk, ska, lounge music, easy listening and film scores, the result of the differing tastes between band members. The group were also noted for their deliberately tongue-in-cheek, dark humoured lyrics inspired by films, which frequently deal with topics such as serial killers, failed relationships, social outcasts, and mental illness. Whilst Space's eclecticism and camp humour polarised listeners and critics, they have maintained a devoted cult following.

Space experienced several lineup changes, with Scott being the only consistent member. Their first two albums, Spiders (1996) and Tin Planet (1998), achieved great success and went platinum in the UK, along with scoring eight UK Top 40 singles. Work on their proposed third album, Love You More than Football, was marred by difficulties and was eventually shelved once the band were released from their contract with Gut. The band disbanded in 2005, following low sales and a lukewarm reception to their fourth album Suburban Rock 'n' Roll (2004), which was nonetheless acclaimed by fans.

Scott went on to form The Drellas, which in 2011 morphed into the second incarnation of Space after Griffiths (and briefly Murphy) joined the group. Space have continued to release studio albums, including Attack of the Mutant 50ft Kebab (2014) and Give Me Your Future (2017). In 2019, twenty years after it was recorded, Love You More than Football was officially released as part of a career-spanning Anthology boxset. The band's seventh album, Music for Pleasure Music for Pain, was released in 2021.

Biography

Tommy Scott and Jamie Murphy first met when Murphy was hired as a roadie for Scott's then band The Australians. After The Australians split in 1992, the pair started a new band called The Substitutes (after the song by The Who), with Murphy playing guitar and Scott filling the role of bassist. Murphy would rename the band Space after the working title for the song "My Own Dream" by The Real People, and they performed their first gig under the name on 15 May 1992 at The Picket in Liverpool. Jamie Island was briefly the band's drummer before being replaced by Andy Parle, and on 5 July 1993 they released a 12-inch single entitled "If Its Real". 

In 1994, Franny Griffiths, who had previously played with Scott in Hello Sunset and The Australians, was brought in to join them on keyboards and electronics, and would eventually establish their distinct style. On 15 January 1995, the band secured a recording contract with Gut Records, who released their first single, "Money", in November that year. The single "Neighbourhood"' followed in March 1996, but it was not until the release of their next single, "Female of the Species", that they achieved top 40 success. This song was also the theme song to the UK television series Cold Feet.

Their debut album Spiders, released in September 1996, enjoyed success and went platinum in the UK. "Female of the Species" also gained moderate airplay on college radio and MTV in the United States, and was widely seen and heard in Australia on the nationally broadcast ABC-TV music video show rage and on the ABC national rock station Triple-J. The line-up increased with the addition of bassist/multi-instrumentalist Yorkie – who started working with the band years before their success with Spiders – in late 1996, so that Scott could concentrate more on vocals and guitar.

A tour of the US followed in mid-1997, which was less successful than many had hoped, with stories of homesickness and, in Murphy's, case a severe nervous breakdown, as well as Scott losing his voice for two months. The death of Yorkie's mother Gladys Palmer, a local Liverpool singer, devastated the band, and Parle left the group straight after the band completed work on their second album. Caffrey was quickly chosen to take over from Parle.

The new record, entitled Tin Planet, was a more mature, focused release than Spiders and was issued in spring 1998, hitting number three in the UK Albums Chart. Like its predecessor, it became a success, but it did upset some fans due to its more softer, pop-friendly songs and the lack of the much more aggressive tracks found on Spiders. In late 1998, for a Honda advertisement, Space recorded a version of The Animals' "We Gotta Get out of This Place", which was featured on The Bad Days EP. The band also recorded a track together with singer Tom Jones for his album Reload, released in 1999.

In 2001, Space parted ways with Gut following certain issues with the label, including the constant postponing of their third album Love You More than Football. Murphy departed from the band the same year, leading to the band retreating from the public eye and release their music to their fans via their website. These recordings were known as Music for Aliens.

After a three-year break from public attention, Space returned in 2004 to release Suburban Rock 'n' Roll, their first proper release of new material since Tin Planet. It failed to earn critical and commercial recognition. The lukewarm reception of the releases and the problems with getting a recording contract, made it financially impossible to carry on.  In 2005, Space announced their decision to go their separate ways.

Since the band's original break-up, most of the former members have continued to play in bands and music industry: Scott, along with Phil Hartley, a former live technician for the group, formed a punk band called the Drellas, which in its final incarnation included Allan Jones on drums and Ryan Clarke on vintage keys. Hartley, who plays bass, also produces for the band, along with other Antipop Records acts such as Metro Manila Aide, The Dead Class, The Temps and Fraktures. Franny Griffiths was with Murphy and Vinnie Camilleri (who played guitar for The Beatles Pre- Ringo drummer Pete Best) with their band Dust, and also making R&B under the name Subway Showdown, while Yorkie is producing for Shack. Franny also co-writes & produces with Vinnie Camilleri for Spaceman V Man.

Andy Parle died on 1 August 2009, aged 42, in Liverpool.
Police said they were treating Parle's death as "unexplained" after he was seen to fall while crossing the road.
Eyewitnesses described Parle tripping and falling after trying to run across a road in Liverpool at around 11.30pm on Saturday.
They said he had been inside the Park Road Fish Bar in Dingle. Some locals ran to his aid and tried to revive him. A taxi full of passengers also stopped to help and paramedics were called, however he died later at the Royal Liverpool Hospital.
Dave Palmer, his former bandmate, said: "It's the saddest, most tragic end you could have."
He added that Parle had been "a brilliant drummer".

In November 2011, Space announced they would reunite for a gig at Christmas to be held at the O2 Academy in their home town of Liverpool. The line-up reunites original members Scott, Murphy and Griffiths as well as some new faces, who have previously played in Scott's current band the Red Scare (formerly known as the Drellas). They also announced the release of a new album, entitled Attack of the Mutant 50ft Kebab, and a world tour in 2012. After two years in the making (which were disrupted by Murphy's second departure), the album was eventually released in March 2014, preceded by the lead single "Fortune Teller". In July, keyboardist Ryan Clarke left the group to focus on other projects. As part of their 20th anniversary, Space announced a tour throughout March 2014 alongside Republica.

In November 2015, Space released the single "Strange World" as a stopgap between albums. In 2016, the band announced that they were working on a new album entitled Give Me Your Future, recorded with Steve Levine, famed for his work with Culture Club. Early copies of the album were sold at Space's homecoming gig at The Arts Club on 22 December 2017, with widespread distribution due in the new year.

In November 2019, a box set entitled The Anthology was released, containing the band's first five studio albums, including the previously unreleased Love You More than Football album, plus B-sides and rarities.

On 27 August 2021, Space released "Hell No", the first single from their seventh album Music for Pleasure Music for Pain which was first made available during a meet and greet at Wax & Beans Records on 23 October 2021, with general distribution set for 12 December 2022. In September 2022, the band announced a 25th anniversary tour for Spiders and Tin Planet in 2023, playing both albums in their entirety, and that Murphy would rejoin them for those shows.

Musical style

Space's sound is noted for its highly eclectic and cinematic nature, which, according to Scouse Pop author Paul Skillen, "challenges convention in an industry that likes to categorize artists into marketable genres". Their embrace of synthesizers and state-of-the-art recording techniques such as looping, sampling, and beats derived from hip hop and dance music helped them stand out from other Liverpool bands of the time, who tended towards more 'traditional' and 'authentic' 1960s-inspired guitar pop. This also enabled them to sidestep the 'retro-gazing' characteristic of the Britpop movement, which they were frequently associated with. Journalist Jennifer Blake wrote that "Space are from Liverpool, but any attempts to cast the band under the somewhat meaningless title of 'Britpop' should be quickly dismissed. Other than the fact that the members of Space are British and make superb pop music, they have little in common with bands like Blur and Oasis. In fact, they have little in common with any other band. Their quirky originality is what makes them so much fun to watch, leaving the audience not sure what to expect."

Space's lyrics cover a broad range of subjects, frequently referencing celebrities and fictional characters, as well as a recurring interest in science fiction and horror films, which is often reflected in their record sleeves. In an interview with Stuart Maconie, frontman Tommy Scott stated the motivation for his songwriting is inspired more by movies and television rather than other musicians: "I'm into films and telly. The songs I write depends on what film I'm into at the time. Some days I'm Noël Coward, some days I think I'm Quentin Tarantino, some days it's Speedy Gonzales" Scott has described Space's approach to creating music as a democratic process: 

Scott claimed it was never the band's intent to write "odd music" and that "we just didn't want to be like every other band. We went into a practice room with a song; we then recorded it and released it. We didn't know what would happen after that. There was no plan; it was just natural. If Space had been contrived, it would have been rubbish." He also stated that, due to the tongue-in-cheek, campy nature of their lyrics, he would get defensive whenever critics would dismiss them as "quirky" or as a novelty act:

Band members

Current members
 Tommy Scott – vocals, guitar, bass guitar (1992-2005, 2011–present)
 Jamie Murphy – lead guitar, vocals (1992–2001, 2011–2012, 2022-present)
 Franny Griffiths – keyboards, synthesizers, melodica, sonic manipulations, turntables, samples, backing vocals (1994-2005, 2011–present)
 Phil Hartley – bass guitar, double bass, keyboards, backing vocals, piano, banjo, orchestrations, record producer (2011–present)
 Allan Jones – drums, guitar, backing vocals (2011–present)

Touring members
 Paul Hemmings – guitar (2016–present)
 Jorden Owoo - vocals (2019–present)

Former members
 Jamie Island - drums (1992-1993)
 Andy Parle – drums (1993–1997; died in 2009)
 David "Yorkie" Palmer – bass guitar, keyboards, backing vocals (1996–2005)
 Leon Caffrey – drums (1997–2005)
 Ryan Clarke – keyboards, vocals (2011–2014)

Timeline

Discography

Studio albums

Compilation albums
 Invasion of the Spiders (collection of all the B-sides and remixes from Spiders) (1997)
 Greatest Hits (2002)
 Music for Aliens (2002–03)
 Greatest Hits & Unheard Bits (2003)
 Greatest Hits: The Collectors Edition (2005)
 Avenging Angels: The Best Of (2009)
 The Anthology... Five Studio Albums B-Sides and Rarities (2019)

Singles

References

External links
MTV article
Official Space website

English alternative rock groups
English electronic music groups
Musical groups from Liverpool
Alternative dance musical groups
Neo-psychedelia groups
Gut Records artists
Musical quartets
Musical groups established in 1992
Musical groups disestablished in 2005
Musical groups reestablished in 2011